USS LST-874 was an  in the United States Navy. Like many of her class, she was not named and is properly referred to by her hull designation.

LST-874 was laid down on 16 October 1944 at Evansville, Indiana, by the Missouri Valley Bridge & Iron Co.; launched on 25 November 1944; sponsored by Mrs. Ernest B. Rainey; and commissioned on 18 December 1944.

USN service history
During World War II, LST-874 was assigned to the Asiatic-Pacific theater and participated in the assault and occupation of Okinawa Gunto from April through June 1945. Following the war, she performed occupation duty in the Far East until early January 1946. LST-874 returned to the United States and was decommissioned on 29 May 1946 and struck from the Navy list on 3 July that same year.

LST-874 earned one battle star for World War II service.

French service history
On 8 June 1948, the ship was sold to Donald P. Loker, then transferred to France. where it was commissioned the RFS Chélif (L9006) where it served in the First Indochina War and the Algerian War

References 

 

 

LST-542-class tank landing ships
World War II amphibious warfare vessels of the United States
Ships built in Evansville, Indiana
1944 ships